Frederick Douglas "Babe" Spearman (January 18, 1917 – November 10, 2010) was an American baseball third baseman in the Negro leagues. He played with the Newark Eagles in 1936. His father, Charlie, and four of his uncles, Henry, Clyde, Willie, and Codie, all played in the Negro leagues.

References

External links
 and Seamheads

1917 births
2010 deaths
Baseball players from Arkansas
Baseball third basemen
Newark Eagles players
Sportspeople from Arkansas
People from Arkadelphia, Arkansas
20th-century African-American sportspeople
21st-century African-American people